"Black Stick" is a 1993 song from Australian rock band The Cruel Sea. The song was released in March 1993 as the lead single from the band's third studio album, The Honeymoon Is Over. It peaked at number 25 on the ARIA Charts.

At the ARIA Music Awards of 1994, the song was nominated for ARIA Award for Best Song but lost out to "The Honeymoon is Over".

"Black Stick" was polled a number 21 in the Triple J Hottest 100, 1993, the second highest placing by an Australian act after their own song, "The Honeymoon is Over".

Tony Cohen said, "I was mixing the same song for three days, perfecting it, and it worked. It was a hit. They [later] said, 'Sorry, now we understand what you were trying to do.' I was just trying to make it so radio friendly, they had to play it, and it worked. The apologies were gracefully accepted."

One song on the B-side, "Crab Stick", is an instrumental version of the A-side. "High Sheriff of Calhoun Parish" is a cover of a Tony Joe White song that spent 18 weeks in the Australian charts in 1970. "Momma Killed a Chicken" is John Lee Hooker's arrangement of a traditional blues song most commonly known by the title "Bottle Up and Go". Both covers were produced by The Cruel Sea and Brett Stanton, who was the assistant engineer on the main song.

Reception
Reviewed in Australian rock magazine Juke at the time of release, it was claimed that, "Adding a syncopated rhythm groove to their already stunning, subtle, string-driven post-spaghetti-western soundscape, this unique musical entity continue their evolution into excellence." The Age called it, "a rap-surf gem."

Woroni said the song, "swaps Tex's usually aggressive sexual persona for an ambiguous, possibly auto-erotic tour over his body (legs like towers, heart as a
muscle etc). Meanwhile, the band's usual lean guitar lines are fleshed out with a semi-Latin twist and a swinging rhythm which makes them sound like the house band at the Copacabana. This, by the way, is a compliment."

Track listing
 "Black Stick"
 "High Sheriff of Calhoun Parish"	
 "Momma Killed a Chicken"	
 "Crab Stick"

Charts

References

The Cruel Sea (band) songs
1992 songs
1993 singles